Ian Hornak (January 9, 1944 – December 9, 2002) was an American draughtsman, painter and printmaker. He was one of the founding artists of the Hyperrealist and Photorealist fine art movements; credited with having been the first Photorealist artist to incorporate the effect of multiple exposure photography into his landscape paintings; and the first contemporary artist to entirely expand the imagery of his primary paintings onto the frames.

Early life and education 

Ian Hornak was born on January 9, 1944, in Philadelphia, Pennsylvania, to Slovakian immigrants, Frank and Rose Hornak (née Vagich). Following Hornak’s birth, the family relocated to Brooklyn Heights, New York, where his mother owned a confectionery; and the family again relocated  to Mount Clemens, Michigan, where they purchased a large working farm.

Hornak graduated from the New Haven High School in Michigan as a member of the National Honor Society; briefly attended University of Michigan–Dearborn; and transferred to Wayne State University in Detroit where he earned a Bachelor of Fine Arts degree in studio art in 1964; and Master of Fine Arts in studio art in 1966.

Between 1966 and 1968 he taught studio art courses at Henry Ford Community College, and Wayne State University.

Career 

While living in Detroit, Hornak was introduced to Lowell Nesbitt, then one of the most successful artists in New York City, by Detroit art dealer, Gertrude Kasle.

In the summer of 1968, Hornak sublet one of Nesbitt’s large studios on West 14th Street in the Meatpacking District, they developed a friendship, and Nesbitt in-turn introduced Hornak into the New York City art scene which included Nesbitt’s then milieu, later to become Hornak’s, artists Willem de Kooning, Lee Krasner, Robert Motherwell, Robert Indiana, Claes Oldenburg, Andy Warhol, and Alex Katz.

Initially, Nesbitt introduced Hornak to Eleanor Ward, then Nesbitt’s dealer, and she included Hornak in group exhibitions at her Stable Gallery, then one of the most important galleries in New York City. Ward, however, announced that she intended to close her gallery in 1970 as she moved toward retirement.

Lee Krasner introduced Hornak in 1970 to Jackson Pollock’s nephew, Jason McCoy, who was then the assistant director of the Tibor de Nagy Gallery. On the strength of Krasner’s recommendation, McCoy and the owner of the gallery, Tibor de Nagy, agreed to sign Hornak to an exclusive contract and to host his first New York City solo exhibition in 1971.

Despite having had multiple critically acclaimed, sold-out exhibitions at Tibor de Nagy; in 1976, Hornak announced that he was moving his representation to the Fischbach Gallery where he remained until 1984.

In 1985, Jimmy Ernst, son of Max Ernst, and stepson of Peggy Guggenheim, recommended Hornak to the Armstrong Gallery in New York City where he had one solo exhibition.

Hornak transferred his representation to the Katharina Rich Perlow Gallery in 1986 where he had nine critically and financially successful solo exhibitions and remained until his death in 2002.

Work 

At age nine, Hornak received a set of oil paints and a book of important Renaissance paintings from his mother as a gift. From the book he credibly interpreted the works of Michelangelo Buonarroti, Leonardo da Vinci and Raphael Sanzio. During an interview with the 57th Street Review in 1976, Hornak said, "I picked up my technique as a child through my interest in art and copying paintings I liked. I especially loved Renaissance painting, because it had clarity and simplification of form and great organization".

Throughout his undergraduate and graduate studies, Hornak concentrated on painting in a realist technique that depicted the rural landscapes of his childhood; as well as erotic subjects that resulted from the then current exploration of his bisexuality. He also created a large body of prints with Renaissance, and Baroque inspired subject matter, mostly in the medium of etching.

In New York, Hornak was among the first artists to produce Photorealist artwork, along with his counterparts Richard Estes, Chuck Close, Malcom Morley, Lowell Nesbitt, and Howard Kanovitz as a reaction to the then dominant Pop Art movement.

In 1970, Hornak debuted the first landscape paintings of his multiple exposure series. He is credited as having been the first photorealist artist to incorporate the concept of multiple exposure photography into his paintings.

In 1985, Jimmy Ernst encouraged Hornak to create a new series of paintings, more expressionistic in technique. The result was a small series of paintings depicting apocalyptic landscapes.

From 1986 until his death in 2002 Hornak produced botanical and still life paintings inspired by the Dutch and Flemish masters from The Golden Age. During that series, Hornak was credited as being the first contemporary artist to fully expand the imagery of his primary canvas onto a frame. Hornak said, "I begin with one flower, then add and subtract, balance and counterbalance. The finesse of the surface, the sensual appeal of the subject matter are there but the beauty lies deeper in the content. My flower pieces derive less from 19th century realists and/or impressionists, with their literal depiction of color, texture and form, and more from the 17th century Flemish painters whose flowers give visual pleasure, and imply a more generalized reality and symbolism".

Hornak said of his own artistic vision in an interview with Cover Magazine in 1994, "While I know that the beautiful, the spiritual and the sublime are today suspect, I have begun to stop resisting the constant urge to deny that beauty has a valid right to exist in contemporary art".

Homes and studios 

Hornak owned a home and a large studio in East Hampton, New York which he used as his primary residence from 1970 until his death in 2002. He also had a secondary penthouse studio on New York City’s Upper East Side near the intersection of East 73rd Street and Park Avenue. Hornak spent the winters at a home and studio that he owned in Sarasota, Florida which he initially built to be near his friend, Jimmy Ernst who also had a home in the region.

Influences

Hornak often cited the Hudson River School artists as major influences, especially Martin Johnson Heade and Frederic Edwin Church in addition to Nineteenth-Century German Romantic Artist, Caspar David Friedrich. Additionally the artist commented on his influences, *"What I so like about Poussin and Cézanne is their sense of organization. I like the way in which they develop space and shape in architectural continuity - the rhythm across their paintings. When I paint a landscape, I get the greatest pleasure out of composing it. As I paint, I try to work out a visual sonata form or a fugue, with realistic images".

Critical response

In response to Hornak’s multiple exposure landscape paintings, John Canaday wrote in The New York Times in 1974, "Mr. Hornak is right at the top of the list of romantically descriptive painters today".

As Hornak was nearing the end of the multiple exposure landscape series, Marcia Corbino wrote in the Sarasota Herald Tribune, "Not since the Hudson River School glorified the grandiose panorama of the natural world in meticulous detail has an American artist embraced landscape painting with the artistic totality of Ian Hornak".

In ARTnews magazine, Gerrit Henry wrote about Hornak’s floral and still life paintings, "Hornak is a rather self-explanatory if not wholly tautological postmodernism. Perhaps, though, his excesses ring true for the approaching millennium: this is 'end-time' painting that exercises its romantic license to the fullest in its presentation of multiple styles of the last fin de siècle – naturalist, symbolist, allegorical, apocalyptic".

Personal life and art collection

Ian Hornak, had a younger sister, Rosemary Hornak who was also a fine artist, and the sole beneficiary of his estate; and younger brother, Michael Hornak.  His nephew by his sister Rosemary, Eric Ian Spoutz was Hornak’s namesake, an art dealer, as well as having been Hornak’s studio manager and later his estate executor.

Hornak was openly bisexual, and his life partner from 1970 to 1976 was Julius Rosenthal Wolf, who was a prominent American casting director, producer, theatrical agent, art collector, art dealer, and the vice president of General Amusement Corporation, then the second largest talent management company in the world During the 1950s and 1960s, Wolf had been the assistant director of Edith Halpert's Downtown Gallery in New York City where he became a champion of American Modernism in the visual arts. Together, Wolf and Hornak lived at their homes in New York City's Upper East Side and at their weekend home in East Hampton, New York, where Hornak continued to live until his own death in 2002. Following Wolf's death in 1976, Frank Burton was Hornak's life partner until Burton's death in 1996.

Throughout the 1950s and 1960s, Wolf dedicated himself to the collection of American Modernist and African American art, which he had developed a professional knowledge of during his time as assistant director of The Downtown Gallery. Later Hornak introduced Wolf to the contemporary art scene in New York City and educated him on the current trends in visual culture. Together Wolf and Hornak assembled a large  collection of artwork and upon Wolf's death in 1976, per Wolf and Hornak's wishes, John G. Heimann, Wolf's estate executor, delivered a bequest of 95 artworks to the Hood Museum of Art and the Hopkins Center for the Arts at Wolf's alma mater Dartmouth College. Among the artists whose original artworks are in the collection are David Burliuk, Willard Metcalf, Louis Eilshemius, Arthur Dove, John Marin, Philip Evergood, Marc Chagall, Ben Shahn, Pat Steir, José Luis Cuevas, Philomé Obin, Larry Rivers, Paul Jenkins, Roy Lichtenstein, Robert Motherwell, Ellsworth Kelly, Leonard Baskin, Robert Indiana, Lee Bontecou, Ad Reinhardt, Jack Youngerman, Stuart Davis, Larry Poons, Lowell Nesbitt, Jacob Lawrence, Marisol, Joe Brainard and Fairfield Porter. The collection also houses a small collection of intimate paintings and drawings by Ian Hornak that Hornak gifted to Wolf including a large portrait of Wolf, titled "Jay Wolf" that Dartmouth College often uses to display Wolf's likeness. The overall collection of artwork which has been dubbed "The Jay Wolf Bequest of Contemporary Art" by the college was exhibited at the Beaumont-May Gallery in The Hopkins Center, Dartmouth College, June 24 to August 28, 1977, and is recognized as the most significant bequest of artwork to Dartmouth College during the 1970s.

Death and legacy
Hornak had an aortic aneurysm on November 17, 2002, while painting in his studio in East Hampton, New York. Though rushed to the Southampton Hospital, and surgery was performed to repair the aorta, he died on December 9, 2002, as a result of complications. He was 58 years old.

On January 21, 2011, Hornak was interred in the Columbarium of Piety in the Iris Terrace section of the Great Mausoleum in the Forest Lawn Memorial Park, Glendale, in Los Angeles County, California. A traveling retrospective exhibition, Transparent Barricades: Ian Hornak, A Retrospective, co-sponsored by the Ian Hornak Foundation, began traveling to museums throughout the United States in 2011 and was scheduled to continue through 2016. Hornak's artwork was the subject of a solo exhibition, on display during the 2013 Presidential Inauguration at the Board of Governors of the Federal Reserve System in the Eccles Building in Washington D.C. under the sponsorship of the Ben Bernanke Administration.

Museum and public collections
Hornak's personal papers and effects entered into the permanent collection of the Smithsonian Institution's Archives of American Art in 2007. His artwork is owned by the permanent collections of the Smithsonian Institution's National Museum of American Art; the Smithsonian Institution's National Museum of American History; the Library of Congress; the Corcoran Gallery of Art; the Detroit Institute of Arts; the Board of Governors of the Federal Reserve System; the Museum of Fine Arts, Boston; the Albrecht-Kemper Museum of Art; the Allen Memorial Art Museum; the Austin Museum of Art; the Barbara Ann Karmanos Cancer Institute; the Canton Museum of Art; the Children's Hospital of Philadelphia; the Hood Museum of Art at Dartmouth College; the Detroit Historical Museum; the Flint Institute of Arts; the Forest Lawn Museum; Galleria Internazionale; The George Washington University Art Galleries; Guild Hall; the Children's Hospital Boston (Harvard Medical School affiliate); the Kinsey Institute for Research in Sex, Gender and Reproduction; the Long Island Museum of American Art, History, and Carriages; the National Czech & Slovak Museum & Library; the National Hellenic Museum; the Ringling College of Art and Design; the Rockford Art Museum; the Jane Voorhees Zimmerli Art Museum at Rutgers University; the Florida State Capital; St. Mary's University, Texas; The Art Gallery at the University of Maryland; the University of Texas at San Antonio; the Frances Lehman Loeb Art Center at Vassar College; the Washington County Museum of Fine Arts; and Wayne State University. In 2012, an additional portion of Hornak's papers and personal effects entered the permanent collection of Dartmouth College's Rauner Special Collections Library.

Sources

External links

Official Website of the Ian Hornak Foundation

1944 births
2002 deaths
20th-century American painters
American male painters
People from East Hampton (town), New York
People from Mount Clemens, Michigan
21st-century American painters
University of Michigan alumni
Wayne State University alumni
Deaths from aortic aneurysm
American people of Slovak descent
Burials at Forest Lawn Memorial Park (Glendale)
20th-century American male artists